Charles Watson (September 1, 1836 – August 22, 1910) was a member of the Wisconsin State Assembly in 1880. A resident of Washburn, Wisconsin, he was a member of the Republican Party. He was born in County Wicklow, Ireland; he emigrated to the United States in 1852 and settled in Wisconsin in 1853.

References

External links

People from Washburn, Wisconsin
Republican Party members of the Wisconsin State Assembly
1836 births
1910 deaths
19th-century American politicians